Jennica Alexis Maitim Garcia (born December 26, 1989) is a Filipino actress, host and director. She is the daughter of veteran actress, Jean Garcia. She is currently a freelance artist. She is also a host in the recently launched channel, One PH.

Filmography

Television

Film

References

External links
Jennica Garcia at iGMA.tv

1989 births
Filipino child actresses
Filipino film actresses
Filipino television actresses
Star Magic
Kapampangan people
Living people
People from Quezon City
Actresses from Metro Manila
ABS-CBN personalities